Pierre Indian Learning Center  (PILC), also known as Pierre Indian School Learning Center, is a grade 1-8 tribal boarding school in Pierre, South Dakota. It is affiliated with the Bureau of Indian Education (BIE).

History
The PILC opened on February 5, 1891, with five students. Crystal Lindell of the Capital Journal wrote that "The Pierre Indian Learning Center might never have been built had the people of Pierre not been fighting to make the city the state capital." In 1904 the federal government bought an additional  of land for the school's use. In 1908 the enrollment count was 156. Eddie Welch, a PhD student in American Indian studies from Pierre who worked on a thesis related to the school, stated that at the time the education of the school did not prepare its graduates to get jobs.

In October 1988 a group attending a meeting with 150 people, including ex-employees, asked the tribes that collectively control the school to remove board members and the school administrator due to various issues. In October 1988 a dormitory supervisor was fired for sending public letters addressing the issue. The former dormitory supervisor filed a lawsuit against the school on the basis that his freedom of speech was violated. In November 1988 the school settled the lawsuit, which meant the employee was not automatically retained but could re-apply for a job if he wanted to.

In 2017, a family of a girl who died at the school in 2015 filed a lawsuit against the school in federal court.

Campus
Dormitory students are put into separate wings by gender and by elementary and middle school levels, so there are a total of four wings.

Student body
In 2017 it had about 200 students from, in addition to South Dakota: Nebraska and North Dakota. Students originated from 15 reservations. Stephen Lee of the Capital Journal wrote that "Many of the students have special needs or are considered “at-risk” students."

See also

 Off-reservation boarding schools operated by the BIE
 Chemawa Indian School
 Flandreau Indian School
 Riverside Indian School
 Sherman Indian High School
 Off-reservation boarding schools operated by tribes
 Circle of Nations Wahpeton Indian School
 Sequoyah Schools

References

Further reading
 Welch, Edward K. “A Model of Assimilation: The Pierre Indian School, 1891-1928” - Master's degree thesis University of South Dakota, 2006.

External links
 Pierre Indian Learning Center

Native American boarding schools
Public middle schools in South Dakota
Public K–8 schools in the United States
Pierre, South Dakota
1891 establishments in South Dakota
Educational institutions established in 1891
Public boarding schools in the United States
Boarding schools in South Dakota
Schools in Hughes County, South Dakota
Native American history of South Dakota